Skirving is a surname. It may refer to:

Adam Skirving (1719-1803), Scottish song writer
Alexander Skirving (1868–1935), trade union secretary and politician
Angie Skirving (born 1981), Australian Women's Field Hockey player
Archibald Skirving (1749–1819), Scottish portrait painter
Ben Skirving (born 1983), English rugby union footballer 
Catherine Seaton Skirving (Ewart) (1818–1897), Canadian philanthropist and volunteer
Imogen Skirving (1937–2016), British hotelier 
John Skirving Ewart or J. S. Ewart (1849–1933), Canadian lawyer 
Robert Skirving, bishop of the Episcopal Diocese of East Carolina, USA
William Skirving (c. 1745–1796) activist, one of the five Scottish Martyrs for Liberty